Admiston has, historically, referred to two places in England:

Aldermaston in Berkshire
Athelhampton in Dorset